Caloptilia rjabovi is a moth of the family Gracillariidae. It is known from Azerbaijan.

References

rjabovi
Moths described in 2001
Endemic fauna of Azerbaijan
Moths of Asia